The Foreign Correspondents' Club in Phnom Penh, capital of Cambodia, is a public bar and restaurant along the Tonle Sap river, not far from
the conjunction with the Mekong river. It is often referred to as 'the FCC,' or just simply 'the F.'

It is in a three-story colonial-style building with wonderful views over the river.

It is currently undergoing a major remodel and upgrade, planned to be complete at the end of 2021.  The earlier configuration was very charming and atmospheric, featuring photos on the wall dating back to the Khmer Rouge invasion of Phnom Penh, taken by war correspondents who used to hang out at FCC back in the day.

The FCC in Phnom Penh is not a private club, like other Foreign Correspondents' Clubs around the world, but members from reciprocal clubs (like the FCC Hong Kong) get a 10% discount on food and
drinks.

The FCC in Phnom Penh has nine hotel rooms. They also have a hotel, restaurant and bar in Siem Reap, the gateway to Angkor Wat.

External links

Phnom Penh
Tourism in Cambodia